Aphomia terrenella, the terrenella bee moth, is a moth of the family Pyralidae. It is found in North America from Michigan, Ontario, Quebec and New York south to Georgia.

The wingspan is about 25 mm. Adults have brownish-gray forewings with an indistinct blackish streak running from the wing base to the middle of the disc. They are on wing from May to August.

The larvae possibly feed on the honeycomb and/or larvae of bees.

References

Moths described in 1848
Tirathabini
Moths of North America